In geometry, the bilunabirotunda is one of the Johnson solids.

Geometry
It is one of the elementary Johnson solids, which do not arise from "cut and paste" manipulations of the Platonic and Archimedean solids.

However, it does have a strong relationship to the icosidodecahedron, an Archimedean solid. Either one of the two clusters of two pentagons and two triangles can be aligned with a congruent patch of faces on the icosidodecahedron. If two bilunabirotundae are aligned this way on opposite sides of the icosidodecahedron, then two vertices of the bilunabirotundae meet in the very center of the icosidodecahedron.

The other two clusters of faces of the bilunabirotunda, the lunes (each lune featuring two triangles adjacent to opposite sides of one square), can be aligned with a congruent patch of faces on the rhombicosidodecahedron. If two bilunabirotundae are aligned this way on opposite sides of the rhombicosidodecahedron, then a cube can be put between the bilunabirotundae at the very center of the rhombicosidodecahedron.

Each of the two pairs of adjacent pentagons (each pair of pentagons sharing an edge) can be aligned with the pentagonal faces of a metabidiminished icosahedron as well.

The bilunabirotunda has a weak relationship with the cuboctahedron, as it may be created by replacing four square faces of the cuboctahedron with pentagons.

Cartesian coordinates 

The following define the vertices of a bilunabirotunda centered at the origin with edge length 1:

where  is the golden ratio.

Related polyhedra and honeycombs

Six bilunabirotundae can be augmented around a cube with pyritohedral symmetry. B. M. Stewart labeled this six-bilunabirotunda model as 6J91(P4).

The bilunabirotunda can be used with the regular dodecahedron and cube as a space-filling honeycomb.

External links

 
 Miracle Spacefilling (Dodecahedron&Cube&Johnson solid No.91)

Johnson solids